Fortress is a video game published by Strategic Simulations in 1983 for the Atari 8-bit family and Apple II. It was written by Jim Templeman and Patty Denbrook. A Commodore 64 port followed in 1984.

Gameplay

Fortress is a game in which the goal is to be the player who finishes the game with the most territory.

The game takes place on a rectangular field, where two opposing players alternate turns. For each turn, a player can either build a new castle or reinforce an existing one. If a new castle is built, it appears with four flags in each cardinal direction showing its zone of control. Players must place their castles in a way so they control most of the playing field. Because the field is limited, after a few turns there is a conflict between the opposing players where the most powerful castle wins.

When playing against the computer, there are five opponents to choose from: "The Squire" (beginner), "Lord Maginot" (the master of defense who will parry the player's moves), "Genghis Khan" (aggressive and strong), "Sir Galahad" (valiant but inexperienced), and finally "Count Vauban" (the most difficult).

Reception
Scorpia reviewed the game for Computer Gaming World, and stated that "Bottom Line: If you like strategy games, this is one you'll want to have!" In a review of the Atari 8-bit version for Antic, Edward Bever wrote, "Simple, fast, and well balanced, Fortress should appeal to anyone who enjoys a game that makes you think."

Popular culture
Australian rock band King Gizzard & the Lizard Wizard used a modified version of the game's box art for the cover art of their 2014 album I'm In Your Mind Fuzz, with credit being given to the original artist on all versions after 2019.

References

External links
1984 Software Encyclopedia from Electronic Games
Review in Softalk
Review in Family Computing
Review in GAMES Magazine

1983 video games
Apple II games
Atari 8-bit family games
Commodore 64 games
NEC PC-8801 games
NEC PC-9801 games
Strategic Simulations games
Turn-based strategy video games
Video games developed in the United States
Video games set in the Middle Ages